Season 2013–14 saw Greenock Morton compete in their seventh consecutive season in the second tier of Scottish football (now called the Scottish Championship), having finished 2nd in the 2012–13 season. Morton also competed in the Challenge Cup, Scottish League Cup and the Scottish Cup.

At the end of the season, they were relegated to Scottish League One for the 2014–15 season.

Story of the season

May
Manager Allan Moore and his assistant Mark McNally agreed new one-year deals with the club, whilst experienced pros Martin Hardie and Colin McMenamin were released.

Nine players were offered new one-year deals but David Hutton, Kyle Wilkie and Peter Weatherson were released.

David O'Brien and Derek Gaston were the first to sign their new contracts. Archie Campbell was next to sign up for another season.

Stranraer striker Craig Malcolm rejected a contract offer as he preferred to stay part-time.

Peter MacDonald was offered a two-year deal by Dundee, and Partick Thistle spoke to Aidan Fulton about a possible move to Firhill.

Scott Taggart agreed a new one-year deal, and Aidan Fulton was offered a full-time deal to avoid him leaving for Partick.

Dumbarton midfielder Chris Turner rejected terms, as did winger Declan McDaid.

A friendly match was arranged to be played at Cappielow against League One side Rotherham United for 9 July 2013.

Morton signed Joe McKee who had been released by Bolton Wanderers, and Thomas O'Ware agreed his new contract.

Further friendlies were announced to be played at Cappielow, against St Johnstone and Sheffield United, with a date announced for the Renfrewshire Cup semi-final against Viewfield Rovers.

Aidan Fulton, David Verlaque, David McNeil and ten other trialists, reserves and U17 players were offered professional contracts with the club.

McNeil agreed to sign his contract with club, to follow in the footsteps of his father John McNeil.

Thomas O'Ware signed his new contract, as did Mark McLaughlin. Fulton also agreed to reject Partick Thistle and go full-time with Morton.

June
Albion Rovers winger David Crawford was invited to pre-season training.

Former JEF United Ichihara Chiba Reserves midfielder Ryan Hirooka was announced as being at the club on trial.

David Verlaque rejected the offer of a trial at Nottingham Forest to stay with Morton. 12 of the 13 youths offered full-time deals accepted them, with only Christopher McLaughlin opting to sign instead for Dundee United.

Chris Millar was brought in as a coach for the U15 side.

Morton signed ex-Hamilton Academical defender Jonathan Page on a free transfer.

On 19 June, the fixture lists were released with Morton facing Cowdenbeath at Cappielow on the opening day.

Morton rejected a £50,000 bid for Michael Tidser from Rotherham United, a second bid for £50k up front was later accepted.

Morton brought in three players to train with the squad for pre-season; Dougie Imrie, Marc Fitzpatrick and James Creaney.

Morton were drawn away to Annan Athletic in the Scottish Challenge Cup first round.

July
Tidser finally joined Rotherham United for £50,000, and signed a three-year contract with the club.

Before the friendly with Sheffield United, Morton signed French goalkeeper Nicolas Caraux on a one-year deal.

Morton also signed left wing-back Marc Fitzpatrick on a one-year deal.

Gambian forward Kabba-Modou Cham flew in from Belgium to sign a two-year deal with the club.

Morton were drawn away to East Fife in the first round of the Scottish League Cup.

Morton signed Dougie Imrie from local rivals St Mirren for one season, as well as former Blackburn Rovers youngster Reece Hands on a two-year deal.

Two more players signed up, Slovakian defenders Tomáš Peciar and Michal Habai.

Morton won the Renfrewshire Cup for the 52nd time, defeating St Mirren at St Mirren Park by four goals to two.

Morton were eliminated from the Challenge Cup, 1–0 by Annan Athletic, after a Peter Weatherson free-kick separated the two sides.

August
Morton progressed to the second round of the League Cup, after defeating East Fife 6–2 after extra time. As a seeded team, they were drawn at home to Montrose in the second round.

Morton announced their squad numbers for the 2013–14 season on 9 August.

The Reserve League fixture list was published on 23 August, with the development squad starting their campaign at Galabank.

Morton won two games in the League Cup for only the second time in 30 years as they defeated Montrose 4–0.

Morton were drawn away to Celtic in the League Cup third round.

Dylan McLaughlin and Ewan McLean were released.

September
It was announced that Cappielow would host the UEFA Youth League fixture between Celtic and Barcelona on 1 October.

Scottish champions Celtic were humbled as Morton progressed to the League Cup quarter final with a 1–0 away victory. Their reward was a home tie against St Johnstone.

Nicolas Caraux and Fouad Bachirou signed contract extensions to keep them at the club until the summer of 2015. Joe McKee also extended his contract. Stephen Stirling signed on again on a short-term deal until January 2014.

October
Morton signed former Rangers striker Nacho Novo on a short-term deal, until January 2014.

Craig Reid re-signed on 18 October on a short-term deal.

Morton were knocked out of the League Cup at the quarter-final stage by St Johnstone, and drawn against Inverness Caledonian Thistle in the fourth round of the Scottish Cup.

November
Jake Nicholson signed after leaving Spurs in the summer.

Allan Moore was sacked on 23 November 2013 after a 5–1 home defeat to Livingston. David Hopkin would take interim charge of the club, assisted by Derek Anderson.

In Hopkin's second match in charge of Morton (the first being a 2–1 defeat at Cliftonhill in November 2002), they were eliminated from the Scottish Cup after a 4–0 thrashing by Inverness.

December
Ex-Kilmarnock manager Kenny Shiels was appointed as the new Morton boss.

Nacho Novo was released on Christmas Eve. Mark McLaughlin also left the club on the same day.

Morton signed Barrie McKay on a month's loan from Rangers, as well as signing ex-Rangers defender Darren Cole on a contract until the end of the season.

A selection of trialists including Garry O'Connor and David Robertson played as Morton lost 1–0 to St Mirren at Parklea.

January
David Robertson signed, along with ex-Wigan Athletic youth defender Jamie McCormack.

Craig Reid, Jake Nicholson and Stephen Stirling were told they could leave the club at the end of their short-term contracts.

Having freed up some wages with the five releases thus far, Shiels signed former Scotland international Garry O'Connor.

Morton completed the signing of former Chelsea and Brighton full-back Ben Sampayo.

Development squad full-back Glenn Eadie was released by mutual consent after receiving limited playing time in the reserves this season.

Tomáš Peciar left the club while Celtic defender Stuart Findlay came in on loan to replace him. Derek Riordan was scheduled to train with Morton.

Jonathan Page was released, while former St Mirren striker Jack Smith signed for the development squad.

Riordan didn't appear at training so Kenny Shiels ended his interest in the player.

Michal Habai moved to Livingston on a free transfer.

Morton's home match against Queen of the South on 25 January was abandoned after a spectator collapsed from a suspected heart attack.

Barrie McKay's loan was extended until the end of the season.

Rowan Vine signed just before the transfer window shut, until the end of the season.

February
Kabba Cham was released from his two-year contract by mutual consent.

Tony Wallace joined Queen's Park on a month's loan.

Stuart Findlay became the first current Morton player to be selected for the Scotland U21 squad in many years. Fouad Bachirou also received his first call-up for the Comoros national football team, and after making his international debut he became the first Morton player to be capped since Paul Fenwick with Canada.

March
Both Findlay and Bachirou played 90 minutes for their respective international sides.

After returning from his loan spell, and playing one match for Morton, Tony Wallace again was loaned out to Queen's Park

April
Shiels signed English midfielder Oliver Emsden on amateur terms.

David Hopkin resigned as Morton's assistant manager on 23 April 2014.

First team transfers
From end of 2012–13 season, to last match of season 2013–14

In

Out

Squad (that played for first team)

Fixtures and results

Friendlies

Scottish Championship

League position is after Morton game, not after round of games in case of postponements.

Scottish Cup

Scottish League Cup

Scottish Challenge Cup

Reserves

League table

Player statistics

All competitions
Additional positions played listed, if have started in more than one this season.

Notes

References

Greenock Morton F.C. seasons
Greenock Morton